Sounds of Vancouver 2010 can refer to one of three albums made for the 2010 Winter Olympics in Vancouver:
Sounds of Vancouver 2010: Opening Ceremony Commemorative Album, from the opening ceremony
Sounds of Vancouver 2010: Closing Ceremony Commemorative Album, from the closing ceremony
Canada's Hockey Anthems: Sounds of the Vancouver 2010 Olympic Winter Games